Philip Mauro (January 7, 1859  – April 7, 1952) was an American lawyer and author.

Biography

Mauro was born in St. Louis, Missouri. He was a lawyer who practiced before the Supreme Court, a patent attorney, and a Christian writer. He prepared briefs for the Scopes Trial. His works include God's Pilgrims, Life in the Word, The Church, The Churches and the Kingdom, The Hope of Israel, Ruth, The Satisfied Stranger, The Wonders of Bible Chronology, The World and its God, The Last Call to the Godly Remnant, More Than a Prophet, Dispensationalism Justifies the Crucifixion, Evolution at the Bar and Of Things Which Soon Must Come to Pass.

In his 1921 work, The Seventy Weeks: And the Great Tribulation, Mauro argued that Herod the Great was the "wilful king" of Daniel 11:36.

Mauro was a creationist and authored an anti-evolution book entitled Evolution at the Bar (1922).

He married Emily Johnston Rockwood in 1882 and had two daughters, Margaret Frances Mauro (1882-1948) and Isabel Rockwood Mauro (later Mrs. Charles Stratton French). Together with his daughter Margaret, Mauro was a passenger on the British ocean liner RMS Carpathia when it rescued the passengers of the Titanic in April 1912.

References

External links

 

1859 births
1952 deaths
American Christian creationists
American Christian writers
Lawyers from St. Louis
Washington University in St. Louis alumni